Khajan may refer to:
 Khajan-e Chahar Dang
 Khajan-e Do Dang